The Indian Navy has been focusing on developing indigenous platforms, systems, sensors and weapons as part of the nation's modernisation and expansion of its maritime forces. As of November 2022, the Indian Navy has 45 vessels of various types under construction, including  destroyers; frigates; corvettes; conventional-powered and nuclear-powered submarines and various other ship, and plans to build a strong navy of 200 vessels and 500 aircraft by 2050. According to Chief of Naval Staff's statement in December 2020, India has transformed from a buyer's navy to a builder's navy.

The increasing interest of the Chinese People's Liberation Army Navy in the Indian Ocean region has led the Indian Navy to invest more in anti-submarine ships, such as the Kamorta-class corvette, long-range maritime reconnaissance aircraft such as Boeing P-8 Poseidon and ships such as the Saryu-class patrol vessel and unmanned aerial vehicles such as the IAI Heron-1. However the lack of a strong submarine fleet has diminished its capabilities to some extent. Post-Chinese intrusions into Ladakh in 2020, it has been announced that the Indian Navy plans to upgrade the military facilities in the Andaman and Nicobar Islands on the eastern seaboard as well as Lakshadweep on the western seaboard, with the aim of having a network of island airbases in both the Arabian Sea and the Bay of Bengal which provides an infrastructure which will guarantee freedom of navigation and overflight to all Indian territories.

Submarines
This indicates that a Request For Information (RFI) has currently been issued for this project. The issue of an RFI is not a commitment for procurement.

Nuclear Submarines

Conventional Submarines

Midget submarines

Ships
This indicates that the project a Request For Information (RFI) has currently been issued for this project. The issue of RFI is not a commitment for procurement.

Aircraft carriers

Amphibious warfare ships

Destroyers

Frigates

Corvettes

Next Generation Fast Attack Craft (NGFACs)

Mine countermeasure vessels

Patrol vessels

Replenishment ships

Survey vessels

Miscellaneous

Aircraft

See also
 List of active Indian Navy ships

References

|}

Ships of the Indian Navy
Military planning